Fukunaga (Kanji: 福永) is a Japanese surname. Notable people with the surname include:

Cary Fukunaga (born 1977), American film director, writer and cinematographer
Gen Fukunaga (born 1962), American businessman
Myles Fukunaga (1909–1929), American kidnapper
, Japanese idol, singer and actress
, Japanese footballer

Japanese-language surnames